A total solar eclipse occurred at the Moon's descending node of the orbit on February 16, 1980. A solar eclipse occurs when the Moon passes between Earth and the Sun, thereby totally or partly obscuring the image of the Sun for a viewer on Earth. A total solar eclipse occurs when the Moon's apparent diameter is larger than the Sun's, blocking all direct sunlight, turning day into darkness. Totality occurs in a narrow path across Earth's surface, with the partial solar eclipse visible over a surrounding region thousands of kilometres wide.
The path of totality crossed central Africa, southern India, and into China at sunset. The southern part of Mount Kilimanjaro, the highest mountain in Africa, also lies in the path of totality. Occurring only about 24 hours before perigee (Perigee on February 17, 1980), the Moon's apparent diameter was larger. This was a Supermoon Total Solar Eclipse because the Moon was just a day before perigee.
All of Somalia witness the totality of the solar eclipse.

Related eclipses

Eclipses in 1980 
 A total solar eclipse on Saturday, 16 February 1980.
 A penumbral lunar eclipse on Saturday, 1 March 1980.
 A penumbral lunar eclipse on Sunday, 27 July 1980.
 An annular solar eclipse on Sunday, 10 August 1980.
 A penumbral lunar eclipse on Tuesday, 26 August 1980.

Solar eclipses of 1979–1982

Saros 130

Tritos series

Metonic series

Notes

References

 Foto Solar eclipse of February 16, 1980
 Prof. Druckmüller's eclipse photography site, Solar eclipse of February 16, 1980

1980 02 16
1980 in science
1980 02 16
February 1980 events
1980 in Zaire
1980 in Tanzania
1980 in Kenya
1980 in India
1980 in Bangladesh
1980 in China
1980 in Burma